Neil Young Archives Volume II: 1972–1976 is a 10-CD box set from American-Canadian folk rock musician Neil Young that was initially released in a limited deluxe box set (and streaming on the Neil Young Archives site) on November 20, 2020. The release is the second box set in his Neil Young Archives series, following 2009's The Archives Vol. 1 1963–1972, and covers a three-and-a-half-year period from 1972–1976. The track list was officially announced on the Neil Young Archives site on September 20, 2020, with the first single, "Come Along and Say You Will", being posted to the site as the Song of the Day on October 14. The set then went up for pre-order on October 16, 2020, as an exclusive release to his online store, with only 3,000 copies being initially made available worldwide. After selling out the following day, Young announced several weeks later that a general retail version, as well as a second pressing of the deluxe box set, is expected to be released to market on March 5, 2021. This was followed by the release of a second single, "Homefires", on October 21, and a third, an alternate version of "Powderfinger", on November 3.

Of the 131 tracks on the track listing, 63 are previously unreleased. These include live and alternate versions of previously released songs. Twelve of the songs on this set have never been released in any form.

Background 

Young's manager Elliot Roberts originally said in 2009 that Volume II would span the period of 1972 through 1982, and would be released "two or three years" after Volume I. In October 2009, Young told Guitar World that a disc called Time Fades Away II would be included in the second volume, noting: "It's interesting because [Time Fades Away II] has a different drummer than what was on that album. Kenny Buttrey was in there for the first half, and Johnny Barbata came in for the second. It's a completely different thing, with completely different songs" (Time Fades Away II would eventually evolve into the Performance Series release Tuscaloosa). Young had also said that "four unreleased albums from this period are being rebuilt ... Chrome Dreams, Homegrown and Oceanside-Countryside are the three unreleased studio albums. Also from this period is the unreleased Odeon Budokan live recording produced by David Briggs and Tim Mulligan".

In May 2014, Young stated that Volume II would be finished by the summer, and that the remaining volumes would be issued relatively quickly following the second. In July 2016, Rolling Stone and the Thrasher's Wheat website reported that Young intended to focus on completing Archives Volume II after his tour with Promise of the Real concluded that October. Although a physical release was still planned, it would also involve a "high-resolution website" and would also include unreleased works entitled Dume and Hitchhiker (Hitchhiker was later released as a standalone album on September 8, 2017, with Dume  later confirmed to be a disc on Volume II). In August 2018, in response to an enquiring fan in the Letters to the Editor section of the NYA Times-Contrarian area of his website, Young had the following to say: "May 2019 the NYA V2 CDs and a separate book by Toshi Onuki will be available. Blu Ray is no longer viable for economic reasons. NYA can give you what the blu ray had though, including Hi Res audio. Thanks NY."

In September 2018, March and April 2019, in response to other fans enquiring on its release in the Letters to the Editor section of the NYA, Neil Young stated: "We are currently reviewing all of the unreleased albums from the Volume II period, which is the seventies. Songs for Judy was one of those. Oceanside Countryside is another. We are reviewing the others." ; "NYA vol 2 late this year/before Christmas. Odeon Budokon is on volume 2 as an album." ; "Volume two has so much content that we have made it into two sets. The first is about ten discs and will include Odeon Budokan. The set covers about 4 or 5 years of intense recording and creativity."

In March 2020, Young confirmed Volume II for release on July 24 of that year. After numerous delays related to the coronavirus pandemic, it was scheduled to be released on November 20, according to the Archives website. A track listing posted to the Archives site on September 20 confirmed Volume IIs contents, and the first single, "Come Along and Say You Will", was posted to the site as the Song of the Day on October 14. The set then went up for pre-order on the 16th as an exclusive release to his online store, with only 3,000 copies being initially made available worldwide. After selling out the following day, Neil and Warner Records announced a second run of the deluxe edition, as well as a general retail version, several weeks later, both of which are scheduled to hit the market on March 5, 2021. This was followed by the release of a second single, "Homefires", on October 21, and a third, an alternate version of "Powderfinger", on November 3.

Track listing

Disc 1 – Everybody’s Alone (1972–1973) 
 "Letter from ‘Nam" (3:35) – previously unreleased song (early version of "Long Walk Home") 
 Neil Young – guitar, harmonica, vocal
 Recorded at A&M Recording Studios, Los Angeles, 11/15/1972. Produced by Neil Young and Henry Lewy.
 "Monday Morning" (2:47) – previously unreleased version of "Last Dance"
 Neil Young – guitar, vocal
 Recorded at A&M Recording Studios, Los Angeles, 11/15/1972. Produced by Neil Young and Henry Lewy.
 "The Bridge" (2:56) – previously unreleased version
 Neil Young – piano, harmonica, vocal
 Recorded at A&M Recording Studios, Los Angeles, 11/15/1972. Produced by Neil Young and Henry Lewy.
 "Time Fades Away" (4:21) – Neil Young with The Stray Gators – previously unreleased version
 Neil Young – guitar, vocal; Ben Keith – lap slide guitar, vocal; Tim Drummond – bass; Jack Nitzsche – piano; Kenny Buttrey – drums
 Recorded at Studio, Broken Arrow Ranch, 12/15/1972. Produced by Elliot Mazer and Neil Young
 "Come Along and Say You Will" (2:28) – Neil Young with The Stray Gators – previously unreleased song
 Neil Young – guitar, vocal; Ben Keith – pedal steel guitar, vocal; Tim Drummond – bass; Jack Nitzsche – piano; Kenny Buttrey – drums
 Recorded at Studio, Broken Arrow Ranch, 12/15/1972. Produced by Elliot Mazer & Neil Young.
 "Goodbye Christians on the Shore" (5:24) – Neil Young with The Stray Gators – previously unreleased song
 Neil Young – guitar, harmonica, vocal; Ben Keith – dobro, vocal; Tim Drummond – bass; Jack Nitzsche – piano; Kenny Buttrey – drums
 Recorded at Studio, Broken Arrow Ranch, 12/15/1972. Produced by Elliot Mazer & Neil Young.
 "Last Trip to Tulsa" (4:19) – Neil Young with The Stray Gators – from the 45 RPM single of "Time Fades Away"
 Neil Young – guitar, vocal; Ben Keith – lap slide guitar; Tim Drummond – bass; Jack Nitzsche – piano; Johnny Barbata – drums
 Recorded at Louisiana State University Assembly Center, Baton Rouge, LA, 2/18/1973. Produced by Neil Young & Elliot Mazer.
 "The Loner" (3:54) – Neil Young with The Stray Gators – previously unreleased version
 Neil Young – guitar, vocal; Ben Keith – lap slide guitar; Tim Drummond – bass; Jack Nitzsche – piano; Johnny Barbata – drums
 Recorded at Myriad Convention Center, Oklahoma City, OK, 3/1/1973. Produced by Elliot Mazer & Neil Young.
 "Sweet Joni" (2:42) – previously unreleased song
 Neil Young – piano, harmonica, vocal
 Recorded at Bakersfield Civic Auditorium, Bakersfield, CA, 3/11/1973. Produced by Elliot Mazer and Neil Young.
 "Yonder Stands the Sinner" – Neil Young with The Stray Gators – from the album Time Fades Away
 Neil Young – guitar, vocal; David Crosby – guitar, vocal; Ben Keith – slide guitar; Tim Drummond – bass; Jack Nitzsche – piano; Johnny Barbata – drums
 Recorded at Seattle Center, Seattle, WA, 3/17/1973. Produced by Neil Young & Elliot Mazer.
 "L.A." (Story) (4:02) – previously unreleased
 Neil Young – guitar, vocal
 Recorded at Memorial Auditorium, Sacramento, CA, 4/1/1973. Produced by Elliot Mazer and Neil Young.
 "L.A." (3:35) – previously unreleased version
 Neil Young – guitar, harmonica, vocal
 Recorded at Memorial Auditorium, Sacramento, CA, 4/1/1973. Produced by Elliot Mazer and Neil Young.
 "Human Highway" (3:04) – Crosby, Stills, Nash & Young – previously unreleased version from aborted Human Highway sessions.
 Neil Young – guitar, vocal; Stephen Stills – guitar, vocal; David Crosby – vocal; Graham Nash – vocal
 Recorded at Studio, Broken Arrow Ranch, 6/29/1973. Produced by Elliot Mazer and CSNY.

Disc 2 – Tuscaloosa (1973) 
 "Here We Are in the Years" (3:56)
 "After the Gold Rush" (4:42)
 "Out on the Weekend" (5:29)
 "Harvest" (4:14)
 "Old Man" (4:17)
 "Heart of Gold" (3:48)
 "Time Fades Away" (6:10)
 "Lookout Joe" (4:59)
 "New Mama" (3:01)
 "Alabama" (3:50)
 "Don’t Be Denied" (8:09)
 Neil Young – guitar, vocal, piano, harmonica; Ben Keith – pedal steel guitar, slide guitar, vocal; Jack Nitzsche – piano, vocal; Tim Drummond – bass; Kenny Buttrey – drums, vocal (all tracks)
 Recorded at Memorial Auditorium, Tuscaloosa, AL, 2/5/1973. Produced by Neil Young & Elliot Mazer.

Disc 3 – Tonight's the Night (1973) 
 "Speakin’ Out Jam" (5:01) – Neil Young and Santa Monica Flyers – previously unreleased version from Tonight’s the Night sessions
 Neil Young – piano, vocal; Nils Lofgren – guitar; Ben Keith – pedal steel guitar; Billy Talbot – bass; Ralph Molina – drums
 Recorded at S.I.R., Hollywood, 8/25/1973. Produced by David Briggs & Neil Young with Tim Mulligan.
 "Everybody’s Alone" (2:44) – Neil Young and Santa Monica Flyers – previously unreleased version from Tonight's the Night sessions
 Neil Young – guitar, vocal; Nils Lofgren – piano, vocal; Ben Keith – pedal steel guitar, vocal; Billy Talbot – bass; Ralph Molina – drums, vocal
 Recorded at S.I.R., Hollywood, 8/26/1973. Produced by David Briggs & Neil Young with Tim Mulligan.
 "Tired Eyes" (4:41) – Neil Young and Santa Monica Flyers – from the album Tonight's the Night
 Neil Young – guitar, harmonica, vocal; Nils Lofgren – piano, vocal; Ben Keith – pedal steel guitar, vocal; Billy Talbot – bass, vocal; Ralph Molina – drums, vocal
 Recorded at S.I.R., Hollywood, 8/26/1973. Produced by David Briggs & Neil Young with Tim Mulligan.
 "Tonight’s the Night" (4:43) – Neil Young and Santa Monica Flyers – from the album Tonight's the Night
 Neil Young – piano, vocal; Nils Lofgren – guitar; Ben Keith – pedal steel guitar, vocal; Billy Talbot – bass; Ralph Molina – drums, vocal
 Recorded at S.I.R., Hollywood, 8/26/1973. Produced by David Briggs & Neil Young with Tim Mulligan.
 "Mellow My Mind" (3:11) – Neil Young and Santa Monica Flyers – from the album Tonight's the Night
 Neil Young – guitar, harmonica, vocal; Nils Lofgren – piano; Ben Keith – pedal steel guitar; Billy Talbot – bass; Ralph Molina – drums
 Recorded at S.I.R., Hollywood, 8/26/1973. Produced by David Briggs & Neil Young with Tim Mulligan.
 "World on a String" (2:27) – Neil Young and Santa Monica Flyers – from the album Tonight's the Night
 Neil Young – guitar, harmonica, vocal; Nils Lofgren – piano; Ben Keith – pedal steel guitar; Billy Talbot – bass; Ralph Molina – drums, vocal
 Recorded at S.I.R., Hollywood, 8/26/1973. Produced by David Briggs & Neil Young with Tim Mulligan.
 "Speakin’ Out" (4:57) – Neil Young and Santa Monica Flyers – from the album Tonight's the Night
 Neil Young – piano, vocal; Nils Lofgren – guitar; Ben Keith – pedal steel guitar, vocal; Billy Talbot – bass; Ralph Molina – drums
 Recorded at S.I.R., Hollywood, 8/26/1973. Produced by David Briggs & Neil Young with Tim Mulligan.
 "Raised on Robbery" (3:37) – Neil Young and Santa Monica Flyers – previously unreleased Joni Mitchell song from Tonight's the Night sessions
 Joni Mitchell – guitar, vocal; Neil Young – guitar, vocal; Nils Lofgren – piano; Ben Keith – lap slide guitar; Billy Talbot – bass; Ralph Molina – drums
 Recorded at S.I.R., Hollywood, 8/26/1973. Produced by David Briggs, Neil Young and Joni Mitchell.
 "Roll Another Number (for the Road)" (3:05) – Neil Young and Santa Monica Flyers – from the album Tonight's the Night
 Neil Young – guitar, vocal; Nils Lofgren – piano, vocal; Ben Keith – pedal steel guitar, vocal; Billy Talbot – bass; Ralph Molina – drums, vocal
 Recorded at S.I.R., Hollywood, 9/9/1973. Produced by David Briggs & Neil Young with Tim Mulligan.
 "New Mama" (2:10) – Neil Young and Santa Monica Flyers – from the album Tonight's the Night
 Neil Young – guitar, vocal, vibes; Nils Lofgren - piano; Ben Keith – vocal; Ralph Molina – vocal; George Whitsell – vocal
 Recorded at S.I.R., Hollywood, 9/10/1973. Produced by David Briggs & Neil Young with Tim Mulligan.
 "Albuquerque" (4:02) – Neil Young and Santa Monica Flyers – from the album Tonight's the Night
 Neil Young – guitar, vocal; Nils Lofgren – piano, vocal; Ben Keith – pedal steel guitar, vocal; Billy Talbot – bass; Ralph Molina – drums, vocal
 Recorded at S.I.R., Hollywood, 9/13/1973. Produced by David Briggs & Neil Young with Tim Mulligan.
 "Tonight’s the Night Part II" (5:18) – Neil Young and Santa Monica Flyers – from the album Tonight's the Night, features previously unreleased extended intro
 Neil Young – piano, vocal; Nils Lofgren – guitar; Ben Keith – pedal steel guitar, vocal; Billy Talbot – bass; Ralph Molina – drums, vocal
 Recorded at S.I.R., Hollywood, 9/13/1973. Produced by David Briggs & Neil Young with Tim Mulligan.

Disc 4 – Roxy: Tonight’s the Night Live (1973) 
 "Tonight’s the Night" (6:48)
 "Mellow My Mind” (3:11)
 “Roll Out The Barrel” (0:52)
 "World on a String" (2:43)
 "Speakin’ Out" (6:37)
 "Albuquerque" (3:51)
 "New Mama" (2:39)
 "Roll Another Number" (4:40)
 "Tired Eyes" (7:02)
 "Tonight’s the Night Part II" (6:38)
 "Walk On" (3:38)
 "The Losing End" (6:20) – previously unreleased live version
 Neil Young – guitar, vocal, piano, harmonica; Ben Keith – pedal steel guitar, slide guitar, vocal; Nils Lofgren – piano, guitar, vocal; Billy Talbot – bass; Ralph Molina – drums, vocal (all tracks)
 Recorded at The Roxy, West Hollywood, CA, 9/20-9/22/1973. Produced by David Briggs & Neil Young.

Disc 5 – Walk On (1973–1974) 
 "Winterlong" (3:08) – from the album Decade
 Neil Young – guitar, vocal; Ben Keith – pedal steel guitar, vocal; Billy Talbot – bass; Ralph Molina – drums, vocal
 Recorded at Studio, Broken Arrow Ranch, 11/28/1973. Produced by David Briggs & Neil Young.
 "Walk On" (2:42) – from the album On the Beach
 Neil Young – guitar, vocal; Ben Keith – slide guitar, vocal; Billy Talbot – bass; Ralph Molina – drums, vocal
 Recorded at Studio, Broken Arrow Ranch, 11/30/1973. Produced by David Briggs & Neil Young.
 "Bad Fog of Loneliness" (2:16) – previously unreleased version from On the Beach sessions
 Neil Young – guitar, vocal; Ben Keith – pedal steel guitar, vocal; Billy Talbot – bass; Ralph Molina – drums, vocal
 Recorded at Studio, Broken Arrow Ranch, 12/1/1973. Produced by David Briggs & Neil Young.
 "Borrowed Tune" (3:25) – from the album Tonight’s the Night
 Neil Young – piano, harmonica, vocal.
 Recorded at Studio, Broken Arrow Ranch, 12/5/1973. Produced by Neil Young & Tim Mulligan.
 "Traces" (2:11) – previously unreleased version from On the Beach sessions
 Neil Young – guitar, harmonica, vocal.
 Recorded at Studio, Broken Arrow Ranch, 12/5/1973. Produced by Neil Young & Tim Mulligan.
 "For the Turnstiles" (3:16) – from the album On the Beach
 Neil Young – banjo guitar, vocal; Ben Keith – dobro, vocal
 Recorded at Studio, Broken Arrow Ranch, 12/14/1973. Produced by Neil Young & Tim Mulligan.
 "Ambulance Blues" (8:59) – from the album On the Beach
 Neil Young – guitar, vocal, harmonica, electric tambourine; Ben Keith – bass; Rusty Kershaw – fiddle; Ralph Molina – hand drums
 Recorded at Sunset Sound, Hollywood, 3/25/1974. Produced by Neil Young & Al Schmitt.
 "Motion Pictures" (4:24) – from the album On the Beach
 Neil Young – guitar, vocal, harmonica; Ben Keith – bass; Rusty Kershaw – slide guitar; Ralph Molina – hand drums
 Recorded at Sunset Sound, Hollywood, 3/26/1974. Produced by Neil Young & Al Schmitt.
 "On the Beach" (7:03) – from the album On the Beach
 Neil Young – guitar, vocal; Ben Keith – hand drums; Graham Nash – Wurlitzer electric piano; Tim Drummond – bass; Ralph Molina – drums
 Recorded at Sunset Sound, Hollywood, CA, 3/28/1974. Produced by Neil Young & Al Schmitt.
 "Revolution Blues" (4:04) – from the album On the Beach
 Neil Young – guitar, vocal; Ben Keith – Wurlitzer electric piano; David Crosby – guitar; Rick Danko – bass; Levon Helm – drums
 Recorded at Sunset Sound, Hollywood, CA, 4/6/1974. Produced by Neil Young & Mark Harman.
 "Vampire Blues" (4:11) – from the album On the Beach
 Neil Young – guitar, vocal; Ben Keith – organ, vocal, hair drum; George Whitsell – guitar; Tim Drummond – bass, percussion; Ralph Molina – drums
 Recorded at Sunset Sound, Hollywood, CA, 4/7/1974. Produced by Neil Young & Mark Harman.
 "Greensleeves" (1:59) – previously unreleased song
 Neil Young – guitar, vocal
 Recorded at Studio, Broken Arrow Ranch, 5/8/1974. Produced by Neil Young

Disc 6 – The Old Homestead (1974) 
 "Love/Art Blues" (2:24) – previously unreleased version
 Neil Young – guitar, harmonica, vocal
 Recorded at Studio, Broken Arrow Ranch, 6/15/1974. Produced by Neil Young & Tim Mulligan.
 "Through My Sails" (3:28) – previously unreleased version
 Neil Young – guitar, vocal
 Recorded at Studio, Broken Arrow Ranch, 6/15/1974. Produced by Neil Young & Tim Mulligan.
 "Homefires" (2:31) – previously unreleased song
 Neil Young – guitar, vocal, harmonica; Tim Drummond – bass
 Recorded at Studio, Broken Arrow Ranch, 6/16/1974. Produced by Neil Young & Tim Mulligan.
 "Pardon My Heart" (3:48) – previously unreleased version
 Neil Young – guitar, vocal; Tim Drummond – bass
 Recorded at Studio, Broken Arrow Ranch, 6/16/1974. Produced by Neil Young & Tim Mulligan.
 "Hawaiian Sunrise" (2:45) – previously unreleased version
 Neil Young – guitar, vocal; Tim Drummond – bass
 Recorded at Studio, Broken Arrow Ranch, 6/16/1974. Produced by Neil Young & Tim Mulligan.
 "LA Girls and Ocean Boys" (2:25) – previously unreleased song
 Neil Young – piano, vocal
 Recorded at Studio, Broken Arrow Ranch, 6/16/1974. Produced by Neil Young & Tim Mulligan.
 "Pushed It Over the End" (7:44) – Crosby, Stills, Nash & Young – previously unreleased version
 Neil Young – guitar, vocal; Stephen Stills - Wurlitzer, clavinet; David Crosby - guitar; Graham Nash - piano, vocals; Tim Drummond - bass; Russ Kunkel - drums
 Recorded at Chicago Stadium, 8/27/1974. Produced by Elliot Mazer and Crosby, Stills, Nash & Young.
 "On the Beach" (7:32) – Crosby, Stills, Nash & Young – previously unreleased mix
 Neil Young – guitar, vocal; Stephen Stills - guitar; David Crosby - guitar; Graham Nash - Wurlitzer, vocals; Tim Drummond - bass; Russ Kunkel - drums; Joe Lala - percussion
 Recorded at Chicago Stadium, 8/28/1974. Produced by Elliot Mazer and Crosby, Stills, Nash & Young.
 "Vacancy" (3:35) – previously unreleased version
 Neil Young – guitar, vocal
 Recorded at Studio, Broken Arrow Ranch, 11/4/1974. Produced by Neil Young & Tim Mulligan.
 "One More Sign" (3:01) – previously unreleased version
 Neil Young – piano, vocal
 Recorded at Studio, Broken Arrow Ranch, 11/4/1974. Produced by Neil Young & Tim Mulligan.
 "Frozen Man" (2:59) – previously unreleased song
 Neil Young – guitar, vocal
 Recorded at Studio, Broken Arrow Ranch, 11/4/1974. Produced by Neil Young & Tim Mulligan.
 "Give Me Strength" (3:02) – previously unreleased version
 Neil Young – guitar, piano, harmonica, vocal; Ellen Talbot - harmony vocal
 Recorded at Studio, Broken Arrow Ranch, 11/4/1974. Produced by Neil Young & Tim Mulligan.
 "Bad News Comes to Town" (2:55) – previously unreleased version
 Neil Young – guitar, vocal
 Recorded at Studio, Broken Arrow Ranch, 11/4/1974. Produced by Neil Young & Tim Mulligan.
 "Changing Highways" (2:00) – Neil Young and Crazy Horse – previously unreleased version
 Neil Young – guitar, vocal; Ben Keith - pedal steel guitar; Frank “Poncho” Sampedro – guitar; Billy Talbot – bass; Ralph Molina – drums
 Recorded at Chess Studios, Chicago, 12/4/1974. Produced by Neil Young & Elliot Mazer.
 "Love/Art Blues" (2:25) – previously unreleased version from Homegrown sessions
 Neil Young – guitar, harmonica, vocal; Ben Keith - dobro, vocal; Tim Drummond - bass
 Recorded at Quadrafonic Sound Studios, Nashville, 12/10/1974. Produced by Neil Young & Elliot Mazer.
 "The Old Homestead" (7:40) – from the album Hawks & Doves
 Neil Young – guitar, vocal; Tim Drummond – bass; Levon Helm – drums; Tom Scribner – saw
 Recorded at Quadrafonic Sound Studios, Nashville, 12/11/1974. Produced by Neil Young & Elliot Mazer.
 "Daughters" (3:30) – previously unreleased song from Homegrown sessions
 Neil Young – guitar, vocal; Ben Keith - pedal steel guitar, vocal; Tim Drummond – bass; Levon Helm – drums; Nicolette Larson - vocal
 Recorded at Quadrafonic Sound Studios, Nashville, 12/11/1974. Produced by Neil Young & Elliot Mazer.
 "Deep Forbidden Lake" (3:41) – from the album Decade
 Neil Young – guitar, vocal; Ben Keith – pedal steel guitar; Tim Drummond – bass; Karl T. Himmel – drums
 Recorded at Quadrafonic Sound Studios, Nashville, 12/13/1974. Produced by Neil Young & Elliot Mazer.
 "Love/Art Blues" (2:40) – previously unreleased version from Homegrown sessions
 Neil Young – guitar, harmonica, vocal; Ben Keith – pedal steel guitar; Tim Drummond – bass; Kenny Buttrey – drums; Stan Szelest - Wurlitzer
 Recorded at Studio, Broken Arrow Ranch, 12/31/1974. Produced by Neil Young & Elliot Mazer.

Disc 7 – Homegrown (1974-1975) 
 "Separate Ways"
 Neil Young – guitar, vocal, harmonica; Ben Keith – pedal steel; Tim Drummond – bass; Levon Helm – drums
 Recorded at Quadrafonic Sound Studios, Nashville, 12/11/1974. Produced by Neil Young & Elliot Mazer.
 "Try"
 Neil Young – guitar, vocal; Ben Keith – pedal steel, vocal; Tim Drummond – bass; Levon Helm – drums; Emmylou Harris – vocal; Joe Yankee – piano
 Recorded at Quadrafonic Sound Studios, Nashville, 12/11/1974. Produced by Neil Young & Elliot Mazer.
 "Mexico"
 Neil Young – piano, vocal
 Recorded at Village Recorders, Los Angeles, 1/21/1975. Produced by Neil Young & Ben Keith.
 "Love Is a Rose"
 Neil Young – guitar, vocal, harmonica; Tim Drummond – bass
 Recorded at Studio, Broken Arrow Ranch, Woodside, CA, 6/16/1974. Produced by Neil Young & Tim Mulligan.
 "Homegrown"
 Neil Young – guitar, vocal; Ben Keith – lap slide guitar; Tim Drummond – bass; Karl T. Himmel – drums
 Recorded at Quadrafonic Sound Studios, Nashville, 12/13/1974. Produced by Neil Young & Elliot Mazer.
 "Florida"
 Neil Young – wine glass, piano strings, vocal; Ben Keith – wine glass, piano strings, narration
 Recorded at Village Recorders, Los Angeles, 1/21/1975. Produced by Neil Young & Ben Keith.
 "Kansas"
 Neil Young – guitar, vocal, harmonica
 Recorded at Village Recorders, Los Angeles, 1/21/1975. Produced by Neil Young & Ben Keith.
 "We Don’t Smoke It No More"
 Neil Young – guitar, vocal, harmonica; Ben Keith – lap slide guitar, vocal; Tim Drummond – bass; Karl T. Himmel – drums; Stan Szelest – piano; Sandy Mazzeo – vocal
 Recorded at Studio, Broken Arrow Ranch, Woodside, CA, 12/31/1974. Produced by Neil Young, Ben Keith & Tim Mulligan.
 "White Line"
 Neil Young – guitar, vocal, harmonica; Robbie Robertson – guitar
 Recorded at Ramport Studios, London, 9/12/1974. Produced by Neil Young & Elliot Mazer.
 "Vacancy"
 Neil Young – guitar, vocal, harmonica; Ben Keith – lap slide guitar, vocal; Tim Drummond – bass; Karl T. Himmel – drums; Stan Szelest – Wurlitzer electric piano
 Recorded at Studio, Broken Arrow Ranch, Woodside, CA, 1/4/1975. Produced by Neil Young, Ben Keith & Tim Mulligan.
 "Little Wing"
 Neil Young – guitar, vocal, harmonica
 Recorded at Village Recorders, Los Angeles, 1/21/1975. Produced by Neil Young & Ben Keith.
 "Star of Bethlehem"
 Neil Young – guitar, vocal, harmonica; Ben Keith – dobro, vocal; Tim Drummond – bass; Karl T. Himmel – drums; Emmylou Harris – vocal
 Recorded at Quadrafonic Sound Studios, Nashville, 12/13/1974. Produced by Neil Young & Elliot Mazer.

Disc 8 – Dume (1975) 
 "Ride My Llama" (3:44) – Neil Young and Crazy Horse – previously unreleased version from Zuma sessions
 Neil Young – guitar, hand claps, vocal; Frank “Poncho” Sampedro – guitar, hand claps; Billy Talbot – bass, hand claps, vocal; Ralph Molina – drums, hand claps, vocal
 Recorded at House, Point Dume, CA, 5/22/1975. Produced by David Briggs & Neil Young.
 "Cortez the Killer" (7:32) – Neil Young and Crazy Horse – from the album Zuma
 Neil Young – guitar, vocal; Frank “Poncho” Sampedro – guitar; Billy Talbot – bass, vocal; Ralph Molina – drums, vocal
 Recorded at House, Point Dume, CA, 5/22/1975. Produced by David Briggs & Neil Young.
 "Don’t Cry No Tears" (2:37) – Neil Young and Crazy Horse – from the album Zuma
 Neil Young – guitar, vocal; Frank “Poncho” Sampedro – guitar; Billy Talbot – bass, vocal; Ralph Molina – drums, vocal
 Recorded at House, Point Dume, CA, 6/1/1975. Produced by David Briggs & Neil Young.
 "Born to Run" (3:19) – Neil Young and Crazy Horse – previously unreleased song from Zuma sessions
 Neil Young – guitar, vocal; Frank “Poncho” Sampedro – guitar; Billy Talbot – bass; Ralph Molina – drums
 Recorded at House, Point Dume, CA, 6/3/1975. Produced by David Briggs & Neil Young.
 "Barstool Blues" (3:02) – Neil Young and Crazy Horse – from the album Zuma
 Neil Young – guitar, vocal; Frank “Poncho” Sampedro – guitar; Billy Talbot – bass, vocal; Ralph Molina – drums, vocal
 Recorded at House, Point Dume, CA, 6/3/1975. Produced by David Briggs & Neil Young.
 "Danger Bird" (6:55) – Neil Young and Crazy Horse – from the album Zuma
 Neil Young – guitar, vocal; Frank “Poncho” Sampedro – guitar; Billy Talbot – bass, vocal; Ralph Molina – drums, vocal
 Recorded at House, Point Dume, CA, 6/3/1975. Produced by David Briggs & Neil Young.
 "Stupid Girl" (3:11) – Neil Young and Crazy Horse – from the album Zuma
 Neil Young – guitar, vocal; Frank “Poncho” Sampedro – guitar; Billy Talbot – bass, vocal; Ralph Molina – drums, vocal
 Recorded at House, Point Dume, CA, 6/8/1975. Produced by David Briggs & Neil Young.
 "Kansas" (3:35) – Neil Young and Crazy Horse – previously unreleased version from Zuma sessions
 Neil Young – guitar, vocal; Frank “Poncho” Sampedro – guitar; Billy Talbot – bass; Ralph Molina – drums
 Recorded at House, Point Dume, CA, 6/12/1975. Produced by David Briggs & Neil Young.
 "Powderfinger" (7:15) – Neil Young and Crazy Horse – previously unreleased version from Zuma sessions
 Neil Young – guitar, vocal; Frank “Poncho” Sampedro – guitar; Billy Talbot – bass; Ralph Molina – drums
 Recorded at House, Point Dume, CA, 6/12/1975. Produced by David Briggs & Neil Young.
 "Hawaii" (4:26) – Neil Young and Crazy Horse – previously unreleased version from Zuma sessions
 Neil Young – guitar, vocal; Frank “Poncho” Sampedro – guitar; Billy Talbot – bass; Ralph Molina – drums
 Recorded at House, Point Dume, CA, 6/18/1975. Produced by David Briggs & Neil Young.
 "Drive Back" (3:34) – Neil Young and Crazy Horse – from the album Zuma
 Neil Young – guitar, vocal; Frank “Poncho” Sampedro – guitar; Billy Talbot – bass, vocal; Ralph Molina – Drums, vocal
 Recorded at House, Point Dume, CA, 6/22/1975. Produced by David Briggs & Neil Young.
 "Lookin’ for a Love" (3:19) – Neil Young and Crazy Horse – from the album Zuma
 Neil Young – guitar, vocal; Frank “Poncho” Sampedro – guitar; Billy Talbot – bass, vocal; Ralph Molina – drums, vocal
 Recorded at Studio, Broken Arrow Ranch, 8/29/1975. Produced by Neil Young & Tim Mulligan.
 "Pardon My Heart" (3:50) – Neil Young and Crazy Horse – from the album Zuma
 Neil Young – guitar, piano, vocal; Tim Drummond – bass; Billy Talbot – vocal; Ralph Molina – vocal
 Recorded at Studio, Broken Arrow Ranch, 6/16/1974, and 8/29/1975. Produced by Neil Young & Tim Mulligan.
 "Too Far Gone" (2:42) – Neil Young and Crazy Horse – previously unreleased version from Zuma sessions
 Neil Young – guitar, vocal; Frank "Poncho" Sampedro – mandolin
 Recorded at Studio, Broken Arrow Ranch, 9/5/1975. Produced by Neil Young & Tim Mulligan.
 "Pocahontas" (3:31) – Neil Young and Crazy Horse – previously unreleased version from Zuma sessions
 Neil Young – guitar, vocal; Frank “Poncho” Sampedro – guitar; Billy Talbot – bass, vocal; Ralph Molina – drums, vocal
 Recorded at Studio, Broken Arrow Ranch, 9/6/1975. Produced by Neil Young & Tim Mulligan.
 "No One Seems to Know" (2:28) – previously unreleased version from Zuma sessions
 Neil Young – piano, vocal
 Recorded at Studio, Broken Arrow Ranch, 9/11/1975. Produced by Neil Young & Tim Mulligan.

Disc 9 – Look Out for My Love (1975-1976) 
 "Like a Hurricane" (8:19) – Neil Young and Crazy Horse – from the album American Stars 'n Bars
 Neil Young – guitar, vocal; Frank “Poncho” Sampedro – Stringman, vocals; Billy Talbot – bass; Ralph Molina – drums, vocal
 Recorded at Studio, Broken Arrow Ranch, 11/29/1975. Produced by David Briggs & Neil Young with Tim Mulligan.
 "Lotta Love" (2:39) – Neil Young and Crazy Horse – from the album Comes a Time
 Neil Young – guitar, vocal; Frank “Poncho” Sampedro – piano, vocal; Billy Talbot – bass, vocal; Ralph Molina – drums, vocal
 Recorded at Wally Heider Recording Studios, Hollywood, 1/10/1976. Produced by David Briggs & Neil Young with Tim Mulligan.
 "Look Out for My Love" (4:07) – Neil Young and Crazy Horse – from the album Comes a Time
 Neil Young – guitar, vocal; Frank “Poncho” Sampedro – guitar; Billy Talbot – bass, vocal; Ralph Molina – drums, vocal
 Recorded at Studio, Broken Arrow Ranch, 1/20/1976. Produced by David Briggs & Neil Young with Tim Mulligan.
 "Separate Ways" (5:25) – The Stills-Young Band – previously unreleased version from Long May You Run sessions
 Neil Young – guitar, vocal; Stephen Stills – piano, guitar; Joe Lala – percussion; Joe Vitale – drums; George "Chocolate" Perry – bass; Jerry Aiello – organ
 Recorded at Criteria Studios, Miami, 2/3/1976. Produced by Stephen Stills, Neil Young & Don Gehman.
 "Let It Shine" (4:46) – The Stills-Young Band – previously unreleased mix from the Long May You Run sessions
 Neil Young – guitar, harmonica, vocal; Stephen Stills – guitar, vocal; Joe Vitale – drums; George “Chocolate” Perry – bass 
 Recorded at Criteria Studios, Miami, 2/4/1976. Produced by Stephen Stills, Neil Young & Don Gehman
 "Long May You Run" (3:56) – The Stills-Young Band – from the album Long May You Run
 Neil Young – guitar, harmonica, vocal; Stephen Stills – guitar, vocal; Joe Lala – percussion, vocal; Joe Vitale – drums, vocal; George "Chocolate" Perry – bass, vocal; Jerry Aiello – organ
 Recorded at Criteria Studios, Miami, 2/5/1976. Produced by Stephen Stills, Neil Young & Don Gehman.
 "Fontainebleau" (4:00) – The Stills-Young Band – from the album Long May You Run
 Neil Young – electric guitar, vocal; Stephen Stills – organ, vocal; Joe Lala – percussion, vocal; Joe Vitale – drums, vocal; George "Chocolate" Perry – bass, vocal; Jerry Aiello – piano
 Recorded at Criteria Studios, Miami, 2/8/1976. Produced by Stephen Stills, Neil Young & Don Gehman.
 "Traces" (3:07) – The Stills-Young Band – previously unreleased version from Long May You Run sessions
 Neil Young – guitar, harmonica, vocal; Stephen Stills – guitar, vocal; Joe Lala – percussion; Joe Vitale – drums; George "Chocolate" Perry – bass, vocal; Jerry Aiello – organ
 Recorded at Criteria Studios, Miami, 2/8/1976. Produced by Stephen Stills, Neil Young & Don Gehman.'
 "Mellow My Mind" (2:42) – previously unreleased live version
 Neil Young – banjo, harmonica, vocal Recorded at Festival Hall, Osaka, 3/5/1976. Produced by David Briggs and Neil Young "Midnight on the Bay" (3:09) – previously unreleased live version
 Neil Young – guitar, harmonica, vocal Recorded at Hammersmith Odeon, London, 3/30/1976. Produced by David Briggs & Neil Young. "Stringman" (3:31) – previously unreleased version
 Neil Young – piano, guitar, vocal Recorded at Hammersmith Apollo, London, 3/31/1976. Overdubs done at CBS Studios, London, 4/1/1976. Produced by David Briggs & Neil Young. "Mediterranean" (2:36) – previously unreleased song
 Neil Young – electric guitar, acoustic guitar, vocal Recorded at CBS Studios, London, 4/1/1976. Produced by David Briggs & Neil Young. "Ocean Girl" (3:23) – Crosby, Stills, Nash & Young – previously unreleased version from Long May You Run/aborted Human Highway sessions
 Neil Young – piano, vocal; Stephen Stills – guitar, vocal; Joe Lala – percussion, vocal; Joe Vitale – drums, vocal; George "Chocolate" Perry – bass, vocal; Jerry Aiello – organ; David Crosby – vocal; Graham Nash – vocal
 Recorded at Criteria Studios, Miami, 4/14/1976. Produced by Stephen Stills, Neil Young & Don Gehman.
 "Midnight on the Bay" (4:02) – Crosby, Stills, Nash & Young – previously unreleased version from Long May You Run/aborted Human Highway sessions
 Neil Young – acoustic guitar, harmonica, vocal; Stephen Stills – guitar, vocal; Joe Lala – percussion, vocal; Joe Vitale – drums, vocal; George "Chocolate" Perry – bass, vocal; Jerry Aiello – organ; David Crosby – vocal; Graham Nash – vocal
 Recorded at Criteria Studios, Miami, 4/14/1976. Produced by Stephen Stills, Neil Young & Don Gehman.
 "Human Highway" (3:01) – Crosby, Stills, Nash & Young – previously unreleased version from Long May You Run/aborted Human Highway sessions
 Neil Young – guitar, vocal; Stephen Stills – bottleneck slide guitar, vocal; David Crosby – vocal; Graham Nash – vocal
 Recorded at Criteria Studios, Miami, 4/15/1976. Produced by Stephen Stills, Neil Young & Don Gehman.

Disc 10 – Odeon Budokan (1976) 
 "The Old Laughing Lady" (5:55) – previously unreleased live version
 Neil Young – guitar, harmonica, vocal
 Recorded at Hammersmith Odeon, London, 3/31/1976. Produced by David Briggs and Tim Mulligan
 "After the Gold Rush" (4:29) – previously unreleased live version
 Neil Young – piano, harmonica, vocal
 Recorded at Hammersmith Odeon, London, 3/31/1976. Produced by David Briggs and Tim Mulligan
 "Too Far Gone" (3:17) – previously unreleased live version
 Neil Young – guitar, vocal
 Recorded at Hammersmith Odeon, London, 3/31/1976. Produced by David Briggs and Tim Mulligan
 "Old Man" (3:48) – previously unreleased live version
 Neil Young – guitar, vocal
 Recorded at Hammersmith Odeon, London, 3/31/1976. Produced by David Briggs and Tim Mulligan
 "Stringman" (3:45) – previously unreleased live version
 Neil Young – piano, vocal
 Recorded at Hammersmith Odeon, London, 3/31/1976. Produced by David Briggs and Tim Mulligan
 "Don’t Cry No Tears" (3:12) – previously unreleased live version
 Neil Young – guitar, vocal; Frank “Poncho” Sampedro – guitar; Billy Talbot – bass, vocal; Ralph Molina – drums, vocal
 Recorded at Nippon Budokan Hall, Tokyo, 3/10/1976. Produced by David Briggs and Tim Mulligan
 "Cowgirl in the Sand" (4:56) – previously unreleased live version
 Neil Young – guitar, vocal; Frank “Poncho” Sampedro – guitar; Billy Talbot – bass, vocal; Ralph Molina – drums, vocal
 Recorded at Nippon Budokan Hall, Tokyo, 3/11/1976. Produced by David Briggs and Tim Mulligan
 "Lotta Love" (2:57) – previously unreleased live version
 Neil Young – guitar, vocal; Frank “Poncho” Sampedro – keyboards; Billy Talbot – bass, vocal; Ralph Molina – drums, vocal
 Recorded at Nippon Budokan Hall, Tokyo, 3/10/1976. Produced by David Briggs and Tim Mulligan
 "Drive Back" (4:37) – previously unreleased live version
 Neil Young – guitar, vocal; Frank “Poncho” Sampedro – guitar; Billy Talbot – bass, vocal; Ralph Molina – drums, vocal
 Recorded at Nippon Budokan Hall, Tokyo, 3/10/1976. Produced by David Briggs and Tim Mulligan
 "Cortez the Killer" (7:04) – previously unreleased live version
 Neil Young – guitar, vocal; Frank “Poncho” Sampedro – guitar; Billy Talbot – bass, vocal; Ralph Molina – drums, vocal
 Recorded at Nippon Budokan Hall, Tokyo, 3/10/1976. Produced by David Briggs and Tim Mulligan

Production

Produced by Neil Young & L.A. Johnson, with John Hanlon

 Audio production at Redwood Digital, Woodside, CA
 Digital editing by Tim Mulligan
 Audio production assistance: Will Mitchell
 Additional mixing: Jeff Pinn
 Assistant engineer: John Hausmann
 Audio tape restoration & analog-to-HDCD® 24-bit 192kHz digital transfers by John Nowland
 Technical Support: Jeff Pinn, Mike Schaff & Harry Sitam

 Mastered by Tim Mulligan
 Additional Mastering by Andrew Mendelson at Georgetown Masters, Nashville, TN, except discs 2,4,7 and 10: Mastered by Chris Bellman at Bernie Grundman Mastering, Hollywood, CA

 Archival audio tape research: Neil Young, Joel Bernstein & John Nowland
 Archives analog & digital librarian: John Hausmann
 Great care has been taken to locate and transfer the original master tape, or best available source tape, using the finest equipment and the shortest signal path.

MULTIMEDIA PRODUCTION:
 Directed by Bernard Shakey
 Produced by Will Mitchell & Hannah Johnson
 Executive producer: Elliot Rabinowitz
 Director of photography: Ben Johnson & Atticus Culver-Reece
 Edited by Toshi Onuki
 Archivist: Hannah Johnson
 Art direction: Toshi Onuki
 Licensing & clearances: Cindi Peters
 Production assistance: Hannah Choe
 Grip & electric: Joe Mendoza
 Dolly operator: Ben Young
 Post-production at Upstream Multimedia, San Carlos, CA

ART & TEXT PRODUCTION:
 Art direction & design: Toshi Onuki & Jenice Heo with Neil Young — Box set art, packaging, & design based on original Volume 1 design by Gary Burden & Jenice Heo for R. Twerk & Co.
 Box art design: Jenice Heo with Neil Young
 Photographs, artwork, text & credits researched & compiled by Hannah Johnson, Joel Bernstein & Toshi Onuki
 Production: Hannah Johnson & Toshi Onuki
 Production assistance: Babak Saadat, Colin Liang & Kenichiro Ohara
 Image licensing and clearances by Cindi Peters, Eric Custer, Daniele Taska & Bonnie Levetin with additional help from Tom Pope, Misao Ohno & Satoshi Yoneda

Special thanks to Mark Faulkner, Kris Kunz, John O’Neill, Liela Crosset, Katie Fox & the NYA Team

Direction: Elliot Roberts

Lookout Management: Frank Gironda, Bonnie Levetin & Tim Bruegger

Inspiration and support: Ben Young, Zeke & Amber Young, Pegi Young

Special thanks: Elliot Roberts & Daryl Hannah

Charts

References

External links

2020 compilation albums
Neil Young compilation albums
Albums recorded at Henson Recording Studios